Hu Mingtian (born 7 August 1994) is a Chinese footballer currently playing as a midfielder for Chengdu Rongcheng.

Club career
Hu Mingtian would start his senior career with third tier football club Jingtie Locomotive in the 2015 China League Two campaign. The following season he would establish himself as a regular, however at the end of the campaign the club dissolved from the professional league. He would join another third tier club in Chengdu Qbao where he quickly established himself as a regular within their team, however at the end of the season the club withdrew from League Two in 2018 when Qbao Group was under investigation for an illegal fund raising scandal. He would join Chengdu Rongcheng, the phoenix club of Chengdu Qbao in the fourth tier. In his first season he would gain promotion with them and establish himself as a regular within the team as he aided them to a meteoric rise through the divisions as the club gained promotion to the top tier at the end of the 2021 league campaign.

Career statistics
.

References

External links

1994 births
Living people
Chinese footballers
Association football midfielders
China League Two players
China League One players
Suzhou Dongwu F.C. players
Chengdu Rongcheng F.C. players